Siwa (minor planet designation: 140 Siwa) is a large and dark main-belt asteroid that was discovered by Austrian astronomer Johann Palisa on October 13, 1874, and named after Šiwa, the Slavic goddess of fertility.

The Rosetta comet probe was to visit Siwa on its way to comet 46P/Wirtanen in July, 2008. However, the mission was rerouted to comet 67P/Churyumov-Gerasimenko and the flyby had to be abandoned.

Attempts to measure the rotation period of this asteroid have produced inconsistent results ranging from 14.7 to 32 hours. Photometric observations of this asteroid at the Organ Mesa Observatory in Las Cruces, New Mexico during 2010 gave an irregular light curve with a period of 34.407 ± 0.002 hours and a brightness variation of 0.05 ± 0.01 in magnitude.

A 2004 study of the spectrum matched a typical C-type asteroid with typical carbonaceous chondrite makeup. There are no absorption features of mafic minerals found. The classification was later revised to a P-type asteroid.

References

External links 
 
 

000140
Discoveries by Johann Palisa
Named minor planets
000140
000140
18741013